Grêmio Desportivo Amarante or Amarante (Capeverdean Crioulo, ALUPEC or ALUPEK: GD Amarantis, São Vicente: GD Amarante) is a football club that had played in the Premier division and plays in the São Vicente Island League in Cape Verde. It is based in the city of Mindelo in the island of São Vicente .

Its logo has a navy blue colored shield with the short name GDA from left to right and bottom and a brown eagle carrying a brown football reading "always ahead" (Portuguese: sempre a frente).  As there is a club named Amarante in Portugal based in Amarante, the club has no affiliation with that club as its logo is different.

History
The club was founded in 1936 and is the island's fourth oldest club in São Vicente.

Amarante has four regional titles won.  It was the second club to win a title in the regionals.  Académica was even in the number of titles from 1953 to 1964, with the exception from 1961 to 1962 where the club had the most titles.  It had the third most in the region until 1985 when FC Derby took the position and became fourth in most regional titles, their fourth and recent was won in 1999.  Since 2012, the title totals are shared with Batuque.

Amarante celebrated its 50th anniversary in 1986.

It is one of a couple of teams that only won one title since independence and was in 1999.  The club won five insular titles and once took part in the colonial in 1961 where they lost to Sporting Clube da Praia and the national in 1999 where they won the only national title. Also at the 1999 national championships, they finished with 13 points, a record stood for two seasons until Fogo's Botafogo took it in 2001, they also had 4 wins and 8 goals scored, half were scored in a match against Juventude do Sal where they won 4–0, one of three matches that was the highest at the national championships that season. At the finals, they faced Fogo's Vulcânicos and defeated it 2–0 in the first leg, the second leg was a goal draw.

In 2011, the club celebrated its 75th anniversary of its foundation.

In the 2015–16 season, Amarante as second placed club in the cup competition lost to Mindelense in the 2015 regional super cup.  Amarante won their only regional Association Cup title.  Amarante finished last place behind Farense and appeared in the regional second division for the first time in January 2017 and became the fourth club after Académica do Mindelo, it started with the Second Division's Association Cup, until then, Amarante was one of five unrelegated clubs in the region. Amarante's final result was 3rd, the level where they will participate again in the Second Division, their second one next season as they were shy of being in the 50/50 zone of ever returning to the Premier Division.  In the cup competition, the club reached up to the Semi-finals and lost a match and was kicked out from further competition.

Amarante played another season in the Second Division on January 28 and made a scoreless goal with Falcões. Amarante struggled for their planned return to the Premier Division as they defeated Corinthians 2–0 in their third overall championship meeting. Ponta de Pom recently defeated Amarante and has 8 points, 2 wins and draws, sharing with Corinthians, Amarante scored 8 and conceded 7 which makes it second, a small chance or a return to the Premier Division lost. Amarante defeated Corinthians on March 3 and kept their chance of returning next season. this continued with a two-goal draw with Falcões and a goal draw with Corinthians. Amarante is still second, the same results but conceded 12 goals, one more than Falcões. Amarante is struggling for a chance to return to the Premier Division next season as well as Falcões, Corinthians and São Pedro, the least are two promotional matches. They have only two points above fourth placed São Pedro.

Playoff advances
GD Amarantes was the 1998/99 season and won the insular title and advanced to the national division.  GD Amarantes challenged the Fogo-based team known as Vulcânicos, the first leg was 2–0, the second leg was a tied game and claimed the title over Vulcânicos.  It is the only time ever as well as other teams that advanced into the national division.

Stadium
The club and plays in the Adérito Sena Stadium with a capacity of once served up to 4,000, now serves 5,000 after the renovation, it is named after one of the first players of the club Adérito Carvalho da Sena (1905–1970).  Mindelense, FC Derby, Académica do Mindelo and Batuque are the other major clubs of the city and the island playing in that stadium along with GS Castilho.  Amarante also trains at the stadium and partly at Adilson Nascimento Field.

Players

Honours
 Cape Verdean Championship: 1
 1999
 São Vicente Island League: 4
 1944, 1945, 1961, 1998/99
Sâo Vicente Association Cup: 1
 2015/16

League and cup history

Colonial era

1961: Amarantes lost the final competition to Sporting Clube da Praia

National championship

Island/regional championship

Statistics
Best position: 1st (national)
Best position at the cup competitions: Finalist (regional)
Best position at an Association Cup: 1st
Appearances in the national competition:
Total: 1
Colonial era: 1
Since independence: 1
Appearances at the regional championships: 79, to be 80
Premier Division: 78
Second Division: 1, to be 2
Appearance at a regional Super Cup competition: Once, in 2015
Appearances at an association cup competition: 16
Total wins: 4 (national)
Total draws: 2 (national)
Total losses: 2 (national)
Total goals scored: 8 (national in 1999)
Total points: 13 (national)
Total matches played: 9 (national)

References

External links
 GD Amarante at Facebook 
 GD Amarante at Sports Mídia 

Football clubs in São Vicente, Cape Verde
Sport in Mindelo
São Vicente Island League Second Division
1930s establishments in Cape Verde
Association football clubs established in 1936